The 2021 Vuelta a España was the 76th edition of Vuelta a España, one of cycling's Grand Tours. The Vuelta began in Burgos on 14 August, and Stage 12 from Jaén to Córdoba occurred on 26 August. The race finished in Santiago de Compostela on 5 September.

Classification standings

Stage 12 
26 August 2021 – Jaén to Córdoba, 

The twelfth stage featured a hilly course from Jaén to Córdoba. Afterwards, the riders immediately climbed the second-category Alto del 14%, a  climb with an average gradient of 5.6 percent, with bonus seconds on offer to the first three riders across the top. The final  of the climb averaged 9.4 percent in gradient. The climb crested with  left, with a descent and a flat section leading back to the finish line in Córdoba.

Much like the previous two days, there was another long fight for the breakaway as the pace remained high for the first  of racing. Inside the final , Mikel Iturria, Sander Armée, and Sebastian Berwick were finally able to establish a gap over the peloton. The eight riders attained a lead of around a minute before  came to the front of the peloton to control the break. As the break reached the Alto de San Jeronimo, Chad Haga was called back by his team from the break. With  to go, a crash took down several riders in the peloton, including Primož Roglič and Adam Yates, but all riders eventually got back up and returned to the peloton. Near the top, Iturria attacked his breakaway companions, but he was eventually chased back down.

On the short valley before the Alto del 14%, the break began to splinter as Maxim Van Gils went solo off the front, with the peloton closing in at around half a minute down. Jonathan Lastra attempted to bridge up to Van Gils but both riders were caught by the peloton on the climb. Towards the top of the climb, a quartet of attackers composed of Giulio Ciccone, Jay Vine, Romain Bardet, and Sergio Henao pulled away from the peloton, building up a lead of half a minute over the peloton at the summit. On the descent, Ion Izagirre and Matteo Trentin attempted to bridge up front but they were caught by the -led peloton. The quartet was gradually brought back, with Vine soloing off the front as the catch was being made before the final kilometre; Vine was eventually brought back within the final kilometre. In the final sprint to the line, Jens Keukeleire led out his sprinter, Magnus Cort, with Andrea Bagioli on Cort's wheel. Cort held off Bagioli to win his second stage by half a wheel. Michael Matthews finished third while Trentin finished fourth. The top ten remained unchanged and Odd Christian Eiking kept the red jersey.

Stage 13 
27 August 2021 – Belmez to Villanueva de la Serena, 

The thirteenth stage featured a flat parcours with rolling terrain that was expected to suit the pure sprinters. There were no categorized climbs on the route, but it featured some minor lumps.

From the start, three attackers, Luis Ángel Maté, Álvaro Cuadros, and Diego Rubio, immediately pulled away from the peloton. They quickly increased their advantage to as much as three minutes before the sprinters' teams began to put riders on the front of the peloton to control the break. The increase in pace dropped the breakaway's advantage to under 20 seconds, but the peloton eventually eased off and the gap increased back up slightly, with the break hovering at around half a minute ahead. At the intermediate sprint, with no other rider challenging him, points classification leader Fabio Jakobsen rode off the front to take maximum points with teammate Bert Van Lerberghe following close behind. With several roundabouts in the final ,  went to the front to set a fast tempo, which caused several splits in the peloton. The  train of Josef Černý, Zdeněk Štybar, and Florian Sénéchal continued to push the pace, with only Matteo Trentin being able to keep up; a small gap had opened up to the next riders on the road, those being Jakobsen, the  sprint train, and the  duo of Egan Bernal and Tom Pidcock. Right as the lead group entered the final kilometre, Jakobsen was dropped, with the team turning to Sénéchal as their next sprint option. In the final sprint to the line, Alexander Krieger came around Van Lerberghe to continue the lead out. Sénéchal and Trentin were the only sprinters remaining, and the former held off the latter to win his first Grand Tour stage. Alberto Dainese came from the rest of the lead group to finish third. Apart from Egan Bernal gaining five seconds on the other contenders at the finish, the rest of the top ten remained unchanged as Odd Christian Eiking kept the red jersey for another day.

Stage 14 
28 August 2021 – Don Benito to Pico Villuercas, 

The race returned to the mountains on the fourteenth stage with another summit finish atop Pico Villuercas. The first  of the stage was flat before going uphill towards the third-category Puerto Berzocana, a  climb with an average gradient of 5.2 percent. With  to go, the riders reached the foot of the final climb of the day, the first-category Pico Villuercas. The climb featured irregular gradients, with an average gradient of just over 6 percent and a maximum gradient of 15 percent.

It took almost  for the breakaway to be established, with a group of 18 riders going off the front. As , the team of race leader Odd Christian Eiking, set a steady pace in the peloton, the break increased their lead to a maximum of around 10 minutes before stabilizing ahead of the Puerto Berzocana. At the top of the first two climbs, Romain Bardet sprinted for maximum KOM points to take the virtual lead in the mountains classification ahead of Damiano Caruso. However, a few kilometres later, Holmes suffered a puncture, dropping him from the front. Inside the last , Jay Vine, who was in the break, came in contact with one of his team's own cars while trying to grab a bidon and crashed, but he eventually got back on his bike. Up front, Prodhomme and Navarro were soon joined by Holmes and Sep Vanmarcke.

Inside the final , a seven-man group, including Bardet, made contact up front, prompting Prodhomme to launch another attack. Navarro and Vanmarcke tried to bridge up to him but both riders crashed on a curve; both riders would get back up. Prodhomme built his advantage to more than a minute ahead of the final climb of the day. From the chasing group, Navarro, Ryan Gibbons, and Andrey Zeits attacked as they chased down Prodhomme. Zeits dropped Navarro and Gibbons on the way to the top, eventually catching Prodhomme with around  left. However, Bardet attacked from the chasing group, passing both Prodhomme and Zeits and soloing off the front. Vine and Jesús Herrada also passed the two riders as they chased Bardet, but the Frenchman gradually increased his lead. Bardet would go on to win the stage, 44 seconds ahead of Herrada and Vine. With his win, Bardet took the lead in the mountains classification with a 19-point buffer over Caruso.

In the GC group,  were content to let the break increase their lead to more than 14 minutes on the way to Pico Villuercas. On the final climb, the  duo of Guillaume Martin and Rémy Rochas attacked, with Martin attempting to gain enough time to take the red jersey from Odd Christian Eiking, albeit unsuccessfully. Giulio Ciccone, who followed Martin’s move, accelerated just as Martin was being caught. After Ciccone was swept up by the peloton, Miguel Ángel López attacked with  left, managing to build a gap over the -led peloton. Inside the final kilometre, Primož Roglič accelerated from the peloton, immediately followed by Enric Mas, Egan Bernal, and Jack Haig. They came to within four seconds of catching López at the finish line while Adam Yates lost 12 seconds to Roglič. Despite losing 20 seconds to Roglič at the finish, Eiking retained the red jersey with a reduced lead of 54 seconds over Martin.

During the stage, Richard Carapaz, who had entered the race as one of the top GC contenders, withdrew after suffering due to fatigue in the high temperatures. After losing time on the first mountainous stage (Stage 3), Carapaz had continued to gradually falter and was 49th on GC at the time of abandonment, almost an hour down on Eiking.

Stage 15 
29 August 2021 – Navalmoral de la Mata to El Barraco, 

The fifteenth stage featured almost  of vertical climbing. The first  were mostly flat apart from an uncategorized climb before the riders reached the first-category Alto de la Centenera, a  climb with an average gradient of 5.5 percent. From there, the run-in to the finish in El Barraco was slightly downhill.

A furious pace marked the start of the day as several riders attempted to break away. The group built an advantage of nearly three minutes before  began to chase at a fast pace. Just before the group was caught, 10 riders from the original break attacked once again. However, several teams in the peloton kept the break in check, with their lead stabilizing at half a minute. Before the group was caught, Magnus Cort and Pavel Sivakov, who were part of the 10-man group, accelerated off the front. However, they were also caught by the peloton, with the attacks starting again afterwards. On the first climb of the day, Maxim Van Gils, Fabio Aru, and Rafał Majka managed to build a gap over the peloton. Towards the top, Van Gils was unable to stay with Majka and Aru, dropping back to a group of 20 chasers. At the top, the duo up front built a lead of a minute and a half over the group of chasers and more than three minutes over the peloton.

Ahead of the Puerto de Pedro Bernardo, Michael Storer, Geoffrey Bouchard, and Gianluca Brambilla attacked out of the chasing group. They were soon joined by Wout Poels and Storer's teammate, Thymen Arensman. Back up front,  from the top, Aru was unable to follow Majka. Majka crossed the top with a 17-second lead over Aru and two minutes over the group of chasers, which had ballooned to 16 riders. On the descent, Aru continued to drift back to the chasing group while Majka maintained his advantage at around two minutes. Ahead of the penultimate climb of Puerto de Mijares, the chasing group split as Bouchard, Arensman, Steven Kruijswijk, and Carlos Verona broke away before catching Aru. Kruijswijk dropped his companions on the climb as he chased Majka. The Pole maintained his advantage over Kruijswijk at around a minute and a half over the top of the climb and on the descent. Majka stayed at the front to the end to complete an  solo, winning the stage by almost a minute and a half over Kruijswijk. Chris Hamilton, who was the only other remnant of the break to stay ahead of the peloton, finished more than two minutes down.

In the GC group,  controlled the peloton for the whole day. On the final climb of the day, Adam Yates animated the group with a few attacks, with his last attack allowing him to build a gap. Yates maintained a 15-second advantage at the finish to take fourth on the stage. Apart from Yates' gains on the stage, there were no other gaps between the contenders as Odd Christian Eiking kept the red jersey heading into the second rest day.

Rest day 2 
30 August 2021 – Santander

Stage 16 
31 August 2021 – Laredo to Santa Cruz de Bezana, 

Coming off the second and final rest day, the sixteenth stage featured one of the last possible chances for the sprinters. Although classified as a flat stage, the course featured rolling hills throughout the stage along with the third-category Alto de Hijas, which crested at  into the stage. The intermediate sprint took place in Santillana del Mar with  left.

A few kilometres after the stage started, a crash took down some riders, splitting the peloton in the process; all those who crashed would eventually get back up. Giulio Ciccone was among those who went down while Enric Mas and Guillaume Martin were among those caught behind the incident. As the peloton slowed down, four riders, Quinn Simmons, Stan Dewulf, Mikel Bizkarra, and Dimitri Claeys, broke away, with Jetse Bol joining them shortly thereafter. During the stage, it was announced that Ciccone, Rudy Molard, and Sep Vanmarcke abandoned the race due to their crash injuries. On the climb of Alto de Hijas, the  pair of Harm Vanhoucke and Maxim Van Gils attacked from the peloton, with Van Gils pacing Vanhoucke up to the break on the descent before dropping back to the peloton.

Jakobsen's group trailed by as much as half a minute, but they would eventually regain contact with  left. Up front, Dewulf dropped his breakaway companions but he was caught with  left. In the final sprint to the line, Jordi Meeus started his sprint first but Jakobsen, on his 25th birthday, came around him to take his third stage win of the race. Meeus held on to second while Matteo Trentin sprinted to third. All the contenders finished safely in the peloton as Odd Christian Eiking retained the red jersey ahead of two difficult mountain stages.

Stage 17 
1 September 2021 – Unquera to Lagos de Covadonga, 

The seventeenth stage was the first of two consecutive mountain stages considered to be decisive in the battle for the red jersey and the overall victory. Following a long valley section, the riders reached the foot of the first-category , which is climbed twice on the stage. The two passages were separated by a valley section as the riders looped back towards the foot of the climb. Bonus seconds were on offer at the top of the second ascent. Following a descent and another long valley section, the riders reached the intermediate sprint in Cangas de Onís with  left. Afterwards, the riders tackled the final climb, the special category Lagos de Covadonga. The climb averages 6.9 percent in gradient over  but the first  averages 9 percent. Towards the top, there is a short descent before a 7.3 percent section followed by another short descent and a 5 percent uphill section towards the finish line.

At the start of the stage, there was a big fight for the break as several riders attempted to pull away. It would take more than  before a 15-man group, including David de la Cruz broke away from the peloton on the first ascent of La Collada Llomena. The front group would soon be joined by Mikel Landa. The break built their lead to a minute at the top, where Michael Storer took the maximum KOM points. Meanwhile, in the peloton, race leader Odd Christian Eiking was dropped near the top before catching back up on the descent. Over the first descent of La Collada Llomena, Olivier Le Gac accelerated from the breakaway. The remaining remnants of the break were eventually caught by the -led peloton, which kept the break on a tight leash, while Le Gac was caught by the peloton with  left to the top of the second ascent of La Collada Llomena. 

 soon took to the front of the peloton to set a fast pace, which thinned out the group and dropped several riders, including Eiking. With  to go, Egan Bernal launched an attack, followed immediately by Primož Roglič. Bernal and Roglič crossed the top with a lead of almost a minute over the chasers with Eiking at more than a minute and a half down. On the descent, several riders crashed, including Eiking and Aleksandr Vlasov; all riders were able to continue the race. The duo up front began to work together on the valley section, increasing their gap to more than two minutes over the chasers. However,  gradually reduced the duo's lead on the valley section, with Roglič and Bernal starting the climb of Lagos de Covadonga with a lead of a minute and a half.

Up front,  from the top, Roglič managed to drop Bernal. He gradually increased his lead towards the top, eventually soloing to his third stage win and the red jersey. Meanwhile, the chase group gradually thinned out on the climb until it was down to just six riders, including Roglič's closest rivals as well as his teammate, Sepp Kuss, and Gino Mäder. López and his teammate, Enric Mas, launched separate attacks but they would be caught each time. In the final , they were able to catch up to Bernal. With Roglič already beginning his post-race descent back down the climb, Kuss led the group over the line at 1' 35" down. Martin lost four minutes on the day while Eiking crossed the line at nine minutes behind.

In the GC, Roglič increased his advantage to 2' 22" over Mas and 3' 11" over López. Jack Haig kept his fourth place at 35 seconds behind López. Martin dropped to fifth at more than four minutes behind, with Bernal, Yates, and Kuss sitting within a minute of him. Eiking dropped out of the top ten, sitting at 11th, just under eight minutes in arrears.

Stage 18 

The eighteenth stage was the second of back-to-back mountain stages that were expected to be decisive in the GC battle. Following the descent, the riders gradually climbed uphill towards the intermediate sprint in Bárzana after  of racing. The descent was immediately followed by the final special category climb of the race, the Altu d'El Gamoniteiru. The first  section averages 10.3 percent before easing into a 3.5 percent section. The final  averages 10.4 percent in gradient, with the climb's steepest section occurring in the final kilometre. The Cima Alberto Fernández was awarded to the stage winner.

James Piccoli kicked off the attacks when he pulled away after just . He would be joined by 31 other riders, with the group quickly building a gap over the peloton. , the only team not represented in the break, began to pace in the peloton after the break was established. The gap increased to a maximum of five minutes before stabilizing. On the first climb, the Puertu de San Llaurienzu, Piccoli pushed on from the break but he was brought back near the top. At the top, Michael Storer took maximum points to increase his total to 44 points in the mountains classification. On the descent, the peloton split under the pace set by  but no contender was caught out, and the peloton eventually reformed. The pace caused the deficit to the break to decrease to three and a half minutes. As the break made their way to the top of Alto de la Cobertoria, Storer launched his attack. He quickly built a lead of a minute over the chasers at the top, where he took maximum points to take the lead in the mountains classification.

On the descent of the Cobertoria, Storer increased his lead to two minutes over the chasers and almost six minutes over the peloton. As the peloton reached the valley section,  began to contribute to the chase. The pace saw Storer's lead decrease to less than three minutes just as he reached the penultimate climb, the Altu la Segá o del Cordal. The peloton caught the chase group on the climb, leaving Storer out front as the only remaining breakaway rider. Towards the top, Romain Bardet and Mikel Bizkarra attacked from the peloton. Bardet dropped Bizkarra on the descent as he held a deficit of around two minutes to his teammate up front. The peloton eventually caught Bardet just as they started the final climb of Altu d'El Gamoniteiru. 

On the lower slopes of Gamoniteiru, Geoffrey Bouchard and David de la Cruz launched separate attacks, joining together before de la Cruz dropped Bouchard as he went off in pursuit of Storer. Meanwhile, from behind, Jan Hirt increased the pace in the main group of contenders for his teammate, Louis Meintjes. Inside the final , Egan Bernal accelerated from the GC group, followed immediately by the  pair of Primož Roglič and Sepp Kuss and the  duo of Enric Mas and Miguel Ángel López. With  to go, López attacked in pursuit of de la Cruz. He immediately dropped de la Cruz after catching him. From behind, Bernal put in a few more accelerations but Roglič and Mas were able to follow him each time. López would not be caught as he soloed to the stage win. Roglič dropped Bernal and Mas towards the line to finish 14 seconds down. Mas took third at 20 seconds down with Bernal a further two seconds in arrears. The group containing the  duo of Jack Haig and Gino Mäder, together with de la Cruz and Meintjes, finished 58 seconds behind.

In the GC, Roglič increased his lead over Mas to 2' 30", with López 23 seconds further in arrears. Haig retained fourth place, but he dropped to four and a half minutes behind while Bernal rounded out the top five at seven seconds behind Haig. Adam Yates and Kuss retained their positions while Mäder climbed to eighth on GC. Guillaume Martin dropped to ninth while Meintjes rounded out the top ten.

Stage 19 
3 September 2021 – Tapia to Monforte de Lemos, 

The nineteenth stage featured a hilly stage with a flat finale. The next  featured rolling terrain.

At the start of the stage, a group of 24 riders broke clear from the peloton. Several riders attempted to bridge up to the break but the chasers were swept up by the peloton. As the break reached the top of the Alto da Garganta, some riders were dropped from the group, leaving 18 out in front. In the peloton, points classification leader Fabio Jakobsen was dropped, with  keeping the pace high to prevent him from coming back. As  gradually decreased the break’s lead, Quinn Simmons attacked from the break with  left. After Simmons was brought back, Rui Oliveira launched his own attack but he was caught by the chase group. At this point, only 11 riders were left up front.

With  left, a crash brought down several riders in the peloton. The biggest victim was Louis Meintjes, sitting in tenth on GC, as he was forced to abandon the race. Meanwhile, up front, as their lead hovered at less than a minute, Simmons accelerated for a second time, with Oliveira following immediately. Five more riders, Andreas Kron, Andrea Bagioli, Anthony Roux, and the  duo of Magnus Cort and Lawson Craddock, slowly closed the gap to the lead duo. Despite their lead hovering at less than half a minute, the break managed to work well together to maintain their advantage to the finish. In the final sprint, Craddock led out his teammate, Cort, before Simmons began his sprint. Cort passed Simmons before holding off Oliveira to take his third stage win of the race. Alberto Dainese led the peloton home at 18 seconds down. The only change in the top ten was David de la Cruz climbing into tenth as a result of Meintjes' withdrawal.

Stage 20 
4 September 2021 – Sanxenxo to Mos (Castro de Herville), 

The penultimate stage, which ran along the Atlantic coast, featured the final chance for the climbers to take some time ahead of the final day time trial. The first half of the stage was characterized by rolling hills while the second half featured five categorized climbs. The first  is the hardest part of the climb, with the maximum gradient at 15 percent. At the bottom of the descent, the riders passed through the intermediate sprint in Baiona with  left. The lower slopes of the climb feature a  section which averages more than 10 percent in gradient before easing towards the top, though the gradients ramp up to around 9.5 percent just before the finish line.

At the start, several riders attempted to put themselves in the break, with the pace remaining high. They would soon be joined by 14 more riders as  took control at the front of the peloton. The break built a maximum advantage of 11 and a half minutes before  began to set a fast pace on the first categorized climb. Up front, Michael Storer took maximum points on the first two climbs to extend his lead in the mountains classification. On the descent of Alto de Mabia, Trentin accelerated from the break, with Mark Padun going off in pursuit of him. At this point, the peloton was closing to within five and a half minutes of the break.

On the climb of Alto de Mougás, Padun, Romain Bardet, Lilian Calmejane, and Ryan Gibbons bridged up to Trentin before Trentin was dropped further up the climb. Storer and Clément Champoussin also made it back to the front on the climb. On the easier gradients near the top of the climb, Trentin, Jan Hirt, Floris De Tier, Jesús Herrada, and Sylvain Moniquet joined the front group. Storer took maximum points at the summit, clinching his lead in the mountains classification. On the descent, Gibbons accelerated at the front of the race. He gradually built his gap over the chasers, extending his lead to almost a minute and a half over the chase group as he started the penultimate climb, the Alto de Prado. 

Meanwhile, in the GC group,  continued to lead on the climb of Alto de Mougás before Adam Yates launched his attack. The only GC rider unable to respond was Sepp Kuss. Egan Bernal also launched an attack towards the top and after Bernal was caught, Yates put in another dig. This time, only Primož Roglič, Enric Mas, and the  pair of Jack Haig and Gino Mäder were able to follow him. Mäder immediately went to the front as Haig was now in position to move ahead of Miguel Ángel López for the last step of the podium. The gap over the López group ballooned on the descent, with the red jersey group building a lead of over four minutes. Over the last two climbs, the group caught the remnants of the break, including the chase group. On the final climb, the Alto Castro de Herville, the group was within a minute of catching Gibbons when Yates attacked. Roglič and Mas immediately followed his move while Haig rode at his own pace before slowly coming back. Yates and Mas launched more attacks towards the top, catching and dropping Gibbons, but the other contenders came back each time. Inside the final , as the four riders looked at each other, Champoussin came from behind before immediately accelerating. He was not immediately chased down as he gained a lead of more than 20 seconds. Champoussin held on to win his first Grand Tour stage, only six seconds ahead of Roglič. Yates and Mas finished eight seconds behind while Haig was a further four seconds in arrears. A four-man group containing Bernal lost almost seven minutes as he surrendered the white jersey to Mäder.

In the GC, Roglič extended his lead to 2' 38" over Mas while Haig moved inside the top three at 4' 48" down. Yates jumped up to fourth, exactly a minute behind Haig while Mäder rounded out the top five at more than eight minutes down. Bernal, Kuss, Guillaume Martin, David de la Cruz, and Felix Großschartner rounded out the top ten. The notable exception was López, who abandoned the race in the middle of the stage. He climbed off his bike in frustration after reportedly being told by his team to stop chasing and despite directeur sportif Patxi Vila's attempts to persuade him to ride again, López eventually left the race.

Stage 21 
5 September 2021 – Padrón to Santiago de Compostela,  (ITT)

The final stage of this year's Vuelta was a  individual time trial from Padrón to Santiago de Compostela, which hosted the finish of the Vuelta for the first time since 2014. After a plateau section, the road continued gradually uphill towards the finish line.

The stage occurred in the late afternoon and early evening. As is customary for individual time trial stages, the riders set off in the reverse order of their GC positions. As a result, Josef Černý was the first rider off the start ramp. Černý, the current Czech time trial champion, set the first benchmark time with a time of 45' 18". His time was threatened by Chad Haga but the American fell short by 27 seconds. Černý's time stood until Magnus Cort beat his time at the two intermediate time checks before setting a time of 44' 16", just over a minute faster than Černý. Thymen Arensman challenged Cort's time but he ended up 38 seconds slower than Cort. Over the course of the day, Fabio Jakobsen and Michael Storer finished safely within the time limit (35% slower than the stage winner's time) to confirm their victories in the points and mountains classifications, respectively.

The focus soon shifted to the battle for the GC placings, with a few spots still to be decided. Odd Christian Eiking was in contention for tenth place, with Felix Großschartner leading him by only 16 seconds at the start of the day. Großschartner set a time of 45' 54", seventh fastest for the stage and beating Eiking's time by more than two and a half minutes to retain his tenth place overall. The eighth spot was also up for grabs, with Guillaume Martin leading ninth-placed David de la Cruz by only eight seconds. De la Cruz finished with a time of 46' 16", more than two minutes faster than Martin. He moved up to seventh overall by also overtaking Sepp Kuss, who was almost three minutes slower than the Spaniard. Sixth-placed Egan Bernal set a time of 45' 51", the sixth fastest on the day while fifth-placed Gino Mäder confirmed his victory in the young rider's classification, only ceding a minute and a half to Bernal. The last spot to be decided was the battle for third, as Jack Haig led Adam Yates by a minute at the start of the day. Yates was 31 seconds faster than Haig at one point but the Australian slowly brought the gap down. Haig eventually finished with a time of 46' 54", 26 seconds faster than Yates, to hold on to his podium spot. The last rider off the start ramp was the race leader, Primož Roglič. He was faster than Cort at the two time checks. Despite almost taking a wrong turn at one point, Roglič set a time of 44' 02", beating Cort's time by 14 seconds to win his fourth stage of the race and confirm his third consecutive Vuelta win. He also overtook Enric Mas, who had started two minutes earlier than Roglič, in the last few hundred metres before the finish line. With his win, Roglič finished the Vuelta with an advantage of more than four and a half minutes, the largest margin of victory since Alex Zülle in 1997. The traditional prize-giving commenced shortly afterwards.

Notes

References

Sources

External links 

2021 Vuelta a España
Vuelta a España stages